The men's freestyle 92 kilograms is a competition featured at the 2020 Individual Wrestling World Cup, and was held in Belgrade, Serbia on 16 and 17 December 2020.

Medalists

Results
Legend
F — Won by fall
R — Retired
WO — Won by walkover

References

External links
Official website

Men's freestyle 92 kg